Dwein Ruedas Baltazar is a Filipina filmmaker. She is best known for directing the films Gusto Kita With All  My Hypothalamus (2018) and Oda Sa Wala (2018). She has also directed a number of iWantTFC series, such as Past, Present, Perfect? (2019) and I Am U (2020).

Baltazar began her career in independent cinema but has since directed a number of works for ABS-CBN, such as the series Marry Me, Marry You (2021). Baltazar's works tend to focus on themes of loneliness and fear.

Early life and education
Baltazar received a BA in Communication Arts from the Colegio de San Juan de Letran in Manila, Philippines. She has stated her cinematic influences to include Michel Gondry and François Ozon.

Career
Baltazar started her career in the entertainment industry as a stylist for film and television, which she worked as for three years for filmmakers such as Raya Martin and Chris Martinez. In 2012, she directed her debut feature Mamay Umeng, which won the Best Picture prize at the 2013 Jeonju International Film Festival. Baltazar's sophomore film, Gusto Kita with All My Hypothalamus, released in 2018, also received international plaudits, winning two awards at the Golden Horse Film Festival in Taipei.

In 2019, Baltazar's film Oda sa Wala was screened in competition at the 54th Karlovy Vary International Film Festival. It also won major awards at the 67th Filipino Academy of Movie Arts and Sciences (FAMAS) Awards, winning Best Picture, Best Screenplay, and Best Director.

In 2021, she directed her first commercial work, the film Hello Stranger: The Movie.

Filmography

Film

Television

References 

Living people
Filipino film directors
Filipino television directors
Filipino women film directors
Women television directors

Year of birth missing (living people)